Carlo Martelli (born 23 May 1966) is an Italian Senator. He is a member of the Italexit party, formerly of the Five Star Movement. He represents Piedmont.

References 

1966 births
Living people
Senators of Legislature XVII of Italy
Senators of Legislature XVIII of Italy
Five Star Movement politicians
Italian eurosceptics
Politicians of Piedmont
Politicians affected by a party expulsion process
Italexit politicians